Tillinger is a surname. Notable people with the surname include:

 Emma Tillinger Koskoff (born 1972), American film producer
 John Tillinger (born 1938), American theatre director and actor

See also
 Dillinger (surname)
 Hillinger